John Callinan (born 1955) is a former Irish sportsperson.  He played hurling with the Clare senior inter-county team from 1973 until 1987.

Early life

John Callinan was born in Clarecastle, County Clare in 1955 into a family of one brother and four sisters.  He was educated locally and would later become one of Clare’s greatest-ever hurling players.
He attended University College Dublin (UCD) where he also played on the University's Hurling Team.

He graduated as a Lawyer and currently practices in Ennis, Co.Clare.

Playing career

Club

Callinan played his club hurling with his local Clarecastle club.  He won senior county championship titles in 1986 and 1987.

Inter-county

Callinan played hurling with the Clare minor team in the early 1970s before making his senior debut in 1973.  The following year he played in his first Munster final, however, his side lost out to Limerick.  Three years later in 1977 Callinan had his first major success when he won a National Hurling League medal. However, this was followed by a Munster final defeat by Cork.  In 1978 he won a second consecutive National League title, however, Clare lost out once again to Cork in the Munster final.  Two further Munster final appearances ended in defeat for Callinan in 1981 and 1986.  He retired from inter-county hurling following defeat in the championship in 1987.

In spite of never winning a championship medal Callinan did win three Railway Cup medals with Munster in 1976, 1978 and 1981.  He also won two All-Star awards in 1979 and 1981.

References

Teams

1955 births
Living people
Clarecastle hurlers
Clare inter-county hurlers
Munster inter-provincial hurlers